The Compendium of Analytical Nomenclature is an IUPAC nomenclature book published by the International Union of Pure and Applied Chemistry (IUPAC) containing internationally accepted definitions for terms in analytical chemistry. It has traditionally been published in an orange cover, hence its informal name, the Orange Book.

Color Books
The Orange Book is one of IUPAC's "Color Books" along with the Nomenclature of Organic Chemistry (Blue Book), Nomenclature of Inorganic Chemistry (Red Book), Quantities, Units and Symbols in Physical Chemistry (Green Book), and Compendium of Chemical Terminology (Gold Book).

Editions
Although the book is described as the "Definitive Rules", there have been three editions published; the first in 1978, the second in 1987 and the third in 1998.

The third edition is available online.

A Catalan translation has also been published (1987).

References

External links
 Official Site

Chemistry books
Chemistry reference works
Chemical nomenclature